Alice Elizabeth Anderson, born Alecia Elizabeth Foley Anderson (8 June 1897 – 17 September 1926), was an Australian businesswoman, garage proprietor, designer, industrial/product designer, and mechanic. Anderson was the owner of the first all-women garage workshop in Australia.

Life and career 
Third child of five children of the Irish-born couple Joshua Thomas Noble Anderson, an engineer, and Ellen Mary (née White-Spunner), Alice Elizabeth Anderson was born in Melbourne, Australia, on 8 June 1897. She grew up in a bush house in Narbethong, a small town in the rural suburbs of Melbourne, where she learned to hunt, fish, horse ride, and had her first contact with driving. During her teenage years, Anderson attended the Melbourne Church of England Girls' Grammar School, however financial struggles forced her to abandon schooling after five terms. Her sisters were Frances Alexandra (Frankie) Derham (1894–1987), artist and art educator, Joan and Claire, who was the first woman engineering student at the University of Melbourne. Her brother Stewart drowned in 1913.

While some writers say Anderson's first contact with vehicles happened in the local co-operative bus service, others say she worked in her father's motoring business as a secretary and the staff taught her to drive. Either way, her interests in motors and technology began in her late childhood.

At the age of 18, Anderson started a part-time job as a clerical worker and, alongside, took groups on weekend touring trips to the Dandenong Ranges. By the age of 21, she settled in Kew and became a full-time worker for her tourism business. A year later, she acquired a block in Cotham Road, constructed a brick garage, and founded the Alice Anderson Motor Service enterprise.

Alice Anderson Motor Service 

Inaugurated in 1919, Alice Anderson Motor Service was the first all-women garage workshop in Australia. The services offered included vehicle repair, chauffeuring with garage-owned cars, interstate touring trips, driving classes, and petrol stations. In addition, women could take educational programs on engine technology, and participate in a mechanics apprenticeship. Due to Anderson's reputation for caring and passion, mothers from all across Australia would send their daughters to the garage to learn to drive. By 1925, the garage was so popular that 50 women applied for the apprenticeship program, the crew grew to 9 members, and the car fleet grew to 5 vehicles. She trained more than thirty young female chauffeurs.

The enterprise continued to operate after Anderson's death until at least 1954, first with Ethel Bage, a close friend of Anderson, as manager, and then with May Rooney.

Death 
On 7 September 1926, Anderson was found dead in her workshop in Kew after a day of work. The coroner's report suggested that she accidentally shot herself while cleaning two of her guns, and family and friends dismissed the possibility of suicide.

The news stated the following day: "Probably no woman in Melbourne was better known. She pioneered the way to motor garages for women, and made a greater success of it than most men could."

Anderson was buried in the Boroondara Cemetery following a graveside service. Young women who worked in her garage acted as pallbearers.

Legacy 
According to the historian Loretta Smith, Anderson "was a woman of 'rare achievement' who excelled as a motoring entrepreneur and inventor." Her best known invention is the car creeper, the ‘Anderson get out and under board’, a board on castor-wheels, for use when working under a car although she did not apply for a patent at the time.

Anderson was involved with several social clubs and associations. She was a founder and Vice-President of The Women's Automotive Club of Australia, and a member of The Lyceum Club, a club for prominent and influential women in the fields of arts, sciences, and contemporary issues. As an advocate for women in garage work, and female independence, she published press articles and contributed to motoring columns.

In 2016, Alice's Garage, a social enterprise, was founded upon Anderson's ideals of women empowerment. Its mission is "to address the inequalities LGBTI Elders face related to ageism and the legacies of our LGBTIphobic histories."

Since 2017, "Alice Anderson's Motor Service" is an exhibition in the National Motor Museum of Australia. In 2018, the project won the "Interpretation Australia, Runners-up – 2018 Awards of Excellence."

In March 2020 Anderson was inducted into the Victorian Honour Roll of Women following nomination by members of the Friends of Boroondara (Kew) cemetery.

References 

1897 births
1926 deaths
Mechanics (people)
20th-century Australian inventors
Australian designers
20th-century Australian women
People educated at Melbourne Girls Grammar
20th-century Australian businesspeople
Australian women in business
Businesspeople from Melbourne
Accidental deaths in Victoria (Australia)
Deaths by firearm in Victoria (Australia)
Australian people of Irish descent
Automotive industry in Australia